→The following is a complete list of compositions by the American composer Larry Thomas Bell.  It was originally compiled by the composer and his wife, the musicologist Andrea Olmstead, cross-referenced with the works listed in his website and The Grove Dictionary of American Music.

References

Lists of compositions by composer
American compositions and recordings